Teafore Bennett (born 7 June 1984 in Duncans, Trelawny Parish) is a Jamaican football striker who currently plays for Village United F.C.

He's most known for his speed and quick running.

Club career
He has played for several clubs, including Village United F.C. and Portmore United F.C. in Jamaica, Virginia Beach Mariners and Harrisburg City Islanders in the US, Banfield in Argentina and Pahang FA in Malaysia.

He was signed by Harrisburg City Islanders six days after he scored against United States on 11 April 2006.

In December 2007, he became the first Jamaican to sign for an African club, Petro Atlético from Angola.

He returned to Jamaica after the 2008 season. On his return, he turned out once again for Village United F.C.

International career
He made his debut for the Reggae Boyz in an October 2004 friendly match against Guatemala and has earned 20 caps, scoring 4 goals. His last international match was a November 2006 friendly against Peru.

External links

References

1984 births
Living people
People from Trelawny Parish
Association football forwards
Jamaican footballers
Jamaica international footballers
Jamaican expatriate footballers
Jamaican expatriate sportspeople in the United States
Jamaican expatriate sportspeople in Sweden
Jamaican expatriate sportspeople in Malaysia
Östers IF players
Portmore United F.C. players
Expatriate soccer players in the United States
Expatriate footballers in Malaysia
Expatriate footballers in Sweden
Village United F.C. players
Virginia Beach Mariners players
Expatriate footballers in Angola
Atlético Petróleos de Luanda players
USL First Division players
USL Second Division players
Allsvenskan players
2005 CONCACAF Gold Cup players
Sri Pahang FC players
Penn FC players
August Town F.C. players